Mohamadou Djibrilla Maïga (July 8, 1908 in Colman Niger – November 23, 1975 in Paris) was a communist politician from Niger who was elected to the French Senate in 1947.

References

Nigerien politicians
French Senators of the Fourth Republic
French communists
1908 births
1975 deaths
Senators of French West Africa